Warang Citi (also written Varang Kshiti or Barang Kshiti; , IPA: /wɐrɐŋ ʧɪt̪ɪ/) is a writing system invented by Lako Bodra for the Ho language spoken in East India. It is used in primary and adult education and in various publications.

It has mainly gained acceptance among the easternmost group of speakers, and is more prevalent among those who have been educated in it. Many other speakers prefer oral transmission of knowledge, Devanagari, or Latin, but Warang Citi holds prestige among many Ho speakers.

History 
Community leader Bodra invented it as an alternative to the writing systems devised by Christian missionaries. He claims that the alphabet was invented in the 13th century by Deowan Turi, and that it was rediscovered in a shamanistic vision and modernized by Lako Bodra.

Characters
It is written from left to right in horizontal lines.

Warang Citi is quite distinct from other writing systems of India, and it has features of an abugida and an alphabet. As in Brahmic abugidas, consonant letters have an inherent vowel, usually /a/ or /ɔ/ but sometimes /ɛ/. The inherent vowel is not pronounced at the end of the word. Unlike in Brahmic abugidas, and more like in an alphabet, the full vowel letters are always written after the consonant, letters usually don't form ligatures, and there is no virama character.

It follows capitalization rules as are done in English and follows English punctuation. There are few ligatures that combine to form new sounds, and there are conjunct consonants that are used as well by stacking in some cases.

The script begins with the letter Ong, which corresponds to Om in other Brahmic scripts. It has 32 letters in total with capital and small letters.

Warang Citi uses its own set of numerals. The digits are used in modern writing, whereas signs for numbers above 9 are falling into disuse.

Unicode

Warang Citi was added to the Unicode Standard in June 2014 with the release of version 7.0.

The Unicode block for Warang Citi is U+118A0–U+118FF. Grey areas indicate non-assigned code points:

References

External links
 Noto Sans Warang Citi, a font made by Google
 An entry at Omniglot

Alphabets
Munda scripts
Ho language
Constructed scripts